Colobothea varia is a species of beetle in the family Cerambycidae. It was described by Johan Christian Fabricius in 1787. It is known from Venezuela, Panama, and French Guiana.

References

varia
Beetles described in 1787